Rothchild may refer to:

People with the surname include:
 Alice Rothchild (born 1948), American obstetrician
 John Rothchild (1945–2019), American writer
 Paul A. Rothchild (1935–1995), American record producer
 Sascha Rothchild (born 1976), American writer

See also 
 Rothschild